Bedingfield is a village and civil parish in the Mid Suffolk district of Suffolk, England. Rishangles and Southolt were included in the population at the 2011 Census.

Notable residents
Thomas Bedingfield (c.1554–1635/36), lawyer and politician who was J.P. for Suffolk from 1584 and the Member of Parliament for Eye in 1586.
Angus McBean (1904-1990), Welsh photographer, set designer and cult figure associated with surrealism.
Jasper Conran (1959- ), fashion designer.
All three have lived at Flemings Hall in the parish.

References

External links

Villages in Suffolk
Mid Suffolk District
Civil parishes in Suffolk